These are the lists of documentary films that were shortlisted for the Academy Award for Best Documentary Feature in recent years.

List of selected films and years

1999

2000

2001

2002

2003

2004

2005

2006

2007

2008

2009

2010

2011

2012

2013

2014

2015

2016

2017

2018

2019

2020

2021

2022

See also
Academy Award for Best Documentary Feature
Academy Award for Best Documentary (Short Subject)
Golden Globe Award for Best Documentary Film

References

Academy Awards lists
Lists of documentary films